Gerrhonotus liocephalus, the Texas alligator lizard or Wiegmann's alligator lizard, is a species of lizard of the Anguidae family. It is found in Texas, Mexico and Guatemala.

References

Gerrhonotus
Reptiles of the United States
Reptiles of Mexico
Reptiles of Guatemala
Reptiles described in 1828
Taxa named by Arend Friedrich August Wiegmann